Neil William Rackers (born August 16, 1976) is a former American football player who was a placekicker in the National Football League (NFL) for twelve seasons.  He played college football for the University of Illinois.  Rackers was drafted by the Cincinnati Bengals in the sixth round of the 2000 NFL Draft, and also played for the NFL's Arizona Cardinals, Houston Texans, and Washington Redskins.

Early years
Rackers attended Aquinas-Mercy High School in St. Louis, Missouri and was a student and a letterman in football, soccer and baseball. In football, he was a two-year letterman and an All-Conference selection. In soccer, Rackers led his team to consecutive state titles and was an All-State selection. In baseball, he was an All-Conference selection.

Professional career

Cincinnati Bengals
Rackers was drafted in the sixth round of the 2000 NFL Draft with the 169th overall pick by the Cincinnati Bengals. He played three seasons for the team, making 44 out of 67 field goals.

Arizona Cardinals
Rackers reached and or surpassed 20 touchbacks in a season twice in his career, and once had a streak of 31 consecutive field goals made before missing a 43-yarder in 2005 against the Jacksonville Jaguars. On New Year's Day in 2006, Rackers kicked his 40th field goal of the season, an NFL record. He was rewarded with a spot in that year's Pro Bowl. He is also one of the few players in NFL history to attempt a fair catch kick.

Houston Texans

Rackers was signed by the Houston Texans on April 5, 2010, replaced Kris Brown later for the 2010 season, and made his first two field goals as a member of the Texans on September 12.

Washington Redskins
Rackers signed a one-year contract with the Washington Redskins on April 24, 2012 and competed with Graham Gano for a spot on the team. On August 27, the Redskins released Rackers.

Retirement
Billy Cundiff's charity confirmed that Rackers retired and would join his cause to cure ovarian cancer.

Career regular season statistics
Career high/best bolded

Life away from football
Rackers is the special teams coach at De Smet Jesuit in the St. Louis, Missouri area. He also owns Kick it Promos and is a radio announcer on 101 ESPN in St. Louis.

References

External links

 Neil Rackers on ESPN.com
 Current stats

1976 births
Living people
Players of American football from Missouri
American football placekickers
Illinois Fighting Illini football players
National Conference Pro Bowl players
Cincinnati Bengals players
Arizona Cardinals players
Houston Texans players
Washington Redskins players